Arthur Clark may refer to:

Arthur Clark (athlete) (1900–?), British Olympic athlete
Arthur H. Clark (1924–2017), Australian sculptor
Arthur Melville Clark (1895–1990), Scottish educationalist and author
Seymour Clark (Arthur Henry Seymour Clark, 1902–1995), English cricketer
Alfred Alexander Gordon Clark (1900–1958), English judge and crime writer under the pseudonym Cyril Hare
Arthur Clark (Massachusetts politician), member of the Great and General Court
Arthur Bridgman Clark (1866–1948), American architect and mayor of Mayfield
Arthur B. Clark (1888–1968), American politician from Mississippi
Arthur Clark (assemblyman), member of the 99th New York State Legislature

See also
Arthur H. Clark Company, printer
Arthur Clarke (disambiguation)
John Arthur Clark (1886–1976), Canadian politician